The 2018 College Hockey America Women's Ice Hockey Tournament was the 16th tournament in league history played between March 1 and March 3, 2018, at the Harborcenter in Buffalo, New York. Mercyhurst won their 12th tournament and earned College Hockey America's automatic bid to the 2018 NCAA National Collegiate Women's Ice Hockey Tournament.

Format
All six CHA Teams participated in the Tournament. On the first day of the Tournament, the top two seeds received a bye, while the #3 seed played the #6 seed, and the #4 seed played the #5 seed in the Quarterfinal round. On the second day, the Semifinal games featured the #1 seed against the lowest remaining seed, while the #2 seed played the highest remaining seed. On the third and final day, the CHA Championship was played between the two Semifinal winners. There was a total of five games.

Standings

Tournament Champion: Mercyhurst

Note: * denotes overtime period(s)

Mercyhurst Forward Emma Nuutinen was named the Tournament MVP

The Tournament Champion earned a berth in the 2018 NCAA National Collegiate Women's Ice Hockey Tournament to determine the national champion. The Mercyhurst Lakers were the number 8 seed out of 8 in the tournament, and lost to #1 seed Clarkson 3–2 in overtime on March 10, in Potsdam, New York.

References

College Hockey America Women's Ice Hockey Tournament
21st century in Buffalo, New York
CHA Women's Ice Hockey Tournament
Sports in Buffalo, New York